General Tso may refer to:

 Tso Tsung-t'ang (1812–1885), Qing Dynasty military leader who suppressed the 1862–1877 Dungan Revolt
 Tso Shih-hai (1870s–1945), Qing Dynasty, Republic of China, and Mengjiang general and official in Inner Mongolia
 General Tso's chicken, dish popular in American Chinese restaurants, believed to be named for Tso Tsung-t'ang

See also
General Tsao (disambiguation)